The 1996 Montana State Bobcats football team was an American football team that represented Montana State University in the Big Sky Conference (Big Sky) during the 1996 NCAA Division I-AA football season. In their fifth season under head coach Cliff Hysell, the Bobcats compiled a 6–5 record (3–4 against Big Sky opponents) and tied for fifth place in the Big Sky.

Schedule

Roster

References

Montana State
Montana State Bobcats football seasons
Montana State Bobcats football